The King County Executive is the highest elected official representing the government of King County, Washington. The post was established with the implementation of the Home Rule Charter for King County on November 5, 1968. Previously the powers of the county executive were vested in a three-member County Commission, which with the implementation of the Home Rule Charter in 1969 ceased to exist. The county executive is elected every four years and the office is nonpartisan.

The first county executive was John Spellman, from 1969 to 1981. The current executive is Dow Constantine, elected to replace Ron Sims since he resigned to become Deputy Secretary of Housing and Urban Development in the Obama administration on May 8, 2009.

List of executives

Notes

See also
Pierce County Executive
Snohomish County Executive
Whatcom County Executive

References

External links
King County Executive

Executive
County officials in Washington (state)
County executives in the United States